In game theory, a Markov strategy is one that depends only on state variables that summarize the history of the game in one way or another. For instance, a state variable can be the current play in a repeated game, or it can be any interpretation of a recent sequence of play.

A profile of Markov strategies is a Markov perfect equilibrium if it is a Nash equilibrium in every state of the game. The Markov strategy was invented by Andrey Markov.

References 

Game theory